Chen Yongliang (born 28 May 1968) is a Chinese wrestler. He competed in the men's freestyle 57 kg at the 1988 Summer Olympics.

References

External links
 

1968 births
Living people
Chinese male sport wrestlers
Olympic wrestlers of China
Wrestlers at the 1988 Summer Olympics
Place of birth missing (living people)
Wrestlers at the 1990 Asian Games
Asian Games competitors for China
20th-century Chinese people
21st-century Chinese people